= Het Anker =

Het Anker was a distillery in Antwerp. Founded in around 1753, it was once reputedly Antwerp’s oldest and largest distillery. The name of the Meeus family was inextricably linked with the company.

== History ==
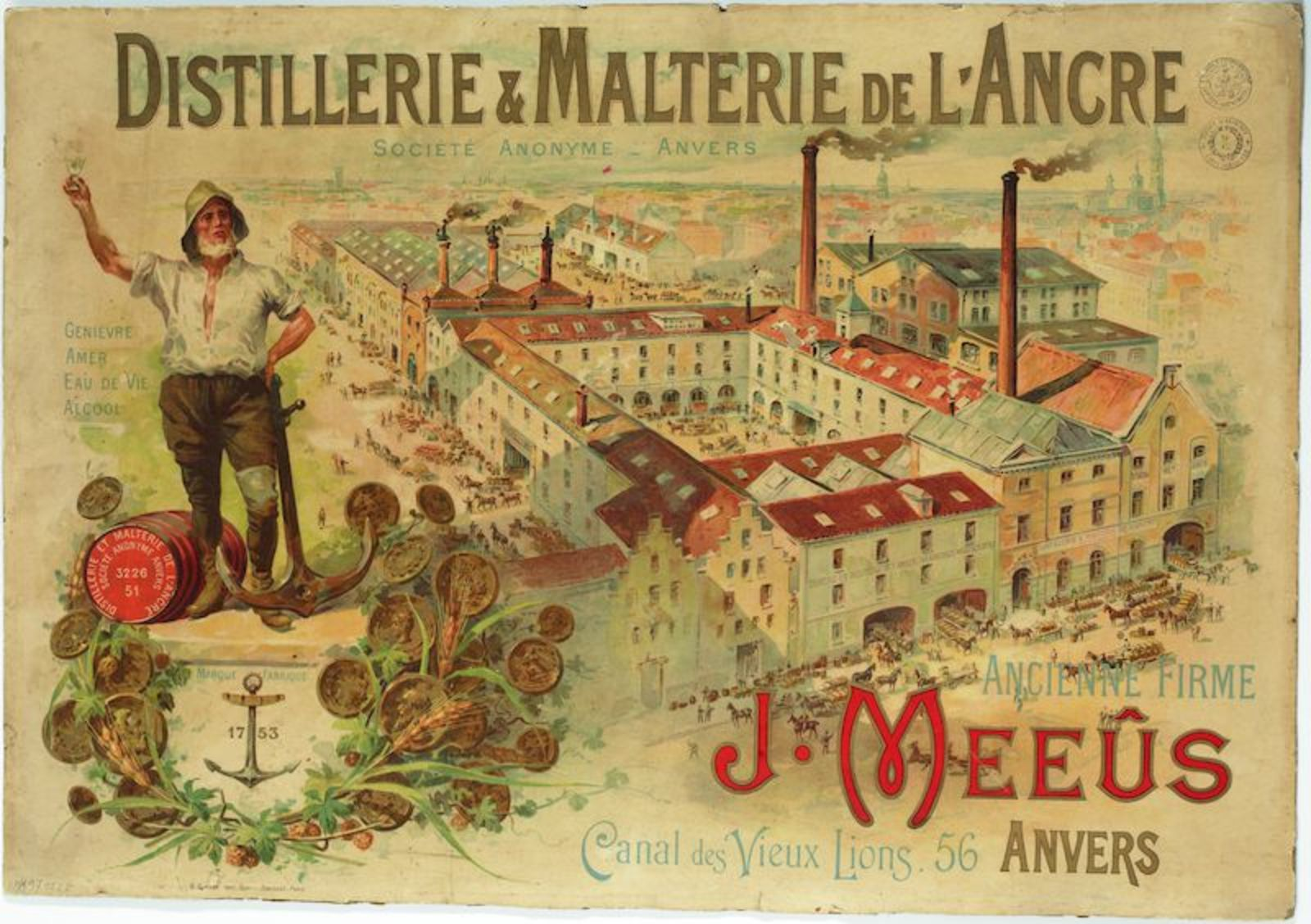
Exterieuraffiche "Distillerie & Malterie de L'Ancre' voor stokerij Meeùs, Antwerpen, 1897-1899

The distillery’s origins go back to as early as 1753. In those days it was located in Boeksteeg. A certain Martinus Adriaenssens then married the distiller's daughter and became the distillery’s new owner. In 1801 Jean Joseph Meeus married the daughter of Martinus Adriaenssens and in 1820 he took over the distillery from his parents-in-law. Under his leadership it expanded and became one of the largest distilleries in the city. It had 2 steam engines of 150 hp and 8 distillation columns. In 1849 Jean Joseph died and his 3 youngest sons, François, Louis and Ferdinand, took over the distillery. François Meeus eventually took over a different distillery and Louis Meeus withdrew from the company, so in 1870 Ferdinand Meeus continued the business alone.

Ferdinand was succeeded by his youngest son Julius Meeus. Julius continued the distillery and changed its name to Het Anker - L'Ancre. When the buildings in Boeksteeg were expropriated for the construction of Nationalestraat, the distillery moved to Oude Leeuwenrui 56-58.

Under the leadership of Julius Meeus, the distillery flourished and took part in several international exhibitions. In 1897 Julius had a new façade built for the distillery on Oude Leeuwenrui. This incorporated a Baroque gate from 1669, which came from a former brewery. In 1896 Het Anker became a public limited company. One year later Julius Meeus left the company. The distillery was dissolved in 1906.
